Reymondia horei is a species of freshwater snail with an operculum, an aquatic gastropod mollusk in the family Paludomidae. This species is found in Burundi, the Democratic Republic of the Congo, Tanzania, and Zambia. Its natural habitat is freshwater lakes.

This species co-occurs with, and is sometimes confused with Reymondia pyramidalis.  It is, however, a separate species.

Description 
The shells of R. horei are composed of six reddish-brown whorls, which are smoothly curved. There is a white band on all whorls. The visible soft parts of the animal are colored grey or olive green, with a brown foot and white sole.

Habitat 
This is a freshwater-adapted species, endemic to Lake Tanganyika. It is most frequently found in the surf zone. It is generally only found on the top side of rocks, but also can be found on sand when there is minimal wave action. The species does appear to segregate by size.

The species is widespread and common, although the most significant threat to its survival is sedimentation of habitat.

References

Paludomidae
Invertebrates of Burundi
Invertebrates of the Democratic Republic of the Congo
Invertebrates of Tanzania
Invertebrates of Zambia
Gastropods of Africa
Freshwater snails
Gastropods described in 1880
Taxonomy articles created by Polbot